Batur was a  of the Soviet Navy.

Development and design 

The project of the submarine tenders was developed in the central design bureau "Baltsudoproekt" under the leadership of the chief designer V. I. Mogilevich. The main observer from the Navy was Captain 1st Rank G.V. Zemlyanichenko. The construction of the lead ship was completed in Nikolaev at the Black Sea shipyard in 1958. In total, seven tenders of project 310 were built for the Soviet Navy between 1958 and 1963.

The crew consisted of 350 people, including 28 officers.

They could serve four submarines of Project 611 or Project 613. The equipment of the floating base was capable of providing navigational and emergency repair of the hull, mechanisms and weapons and storage of 42  torpedoes in a special room. A 100-ton crane was housed at the bow of the ship.

The defensive armaments of the ships consisted of four single-barreled  artillery mounts B-34USMA and four  twin installations ZIF-31 with the Ryf control radar, the sonar station was not provided. After modernization, on two ships, instead of two aft 100 mm installations, a take-off and landing pad was equipped for basing one Ka-25 helicopter. On the last floating base of the series, the Osa-M air defense missile system was installed.

Construction and career
The ship was built at the Black Sea Shipyard in Mykolaiv and was launched on 29 November 1956 and commissioned into the Black Sea Fleet on 28 March 1958.

In 1960, she was transferred to the Pacific Fleet.

She was renamed Kamchatsky Komsomolets on 12 March 1966.

She was renamed PB-9 on 15 February 1992.

She was decommissioned on 28 April 1998 and later scrapped.

Pennant numbers

See also 
List of ships of the Soviet Navy
List of ships of Russia by project number

References

Don-class submarine tenders
Ships built at the Black Sea Shipyard
Auxiliary ships of the Soviet Navy
1957 ships